Also sprach Zarathustra is an 1896 tone poem by Richard Strauss.

Also sprach Zarathustra may also refer to:

Literature
 Thus Spoke Zarathustra, a book by Friedrich Nietzsche, published from 1883 to 1885
 Dies irae: Also sprach Zarathustra, a visual novel

Music
 Also Sprach Zarathustra (album), a 2017 album by Laibach
 "Also Sprach Zarathustra (2001)", a 1973 instrumental by Eumir Deodato from Prelude
 Also sprach Zarathustra, Op. 14, a 1911/12 work for baritone voice, three choruses and orchestra by Carl Orff
 "Also sprach Zarathustra", a song by Prince from the Prince 20Ten tour

Other uses
 Also Sprach Zarathustra (painting), a 1995–1997 cycle of paintings by Lena Hades
 Xenosaga Episode III: Also sprach Zarathustra, a video game in the Xenosaga series

See also
 Zarathustra (disambiguation)